Tesfaye Walda Simeon "Tes" Bramble (born 20 July 1980) is a former footballer who played as a striker. He made over 200 appearances in the Football League, scoring 43 goals, between 2001 and 2007. Born in England, he played international football for the Montserrat national team.

Career
Born in Ipswich, England, Bramble is the brother of footballer Titus Bramble. He started his career at Chelmsford City and went to Southern League club Cambridge City before signing for Southend United in January 2001. Manager Dave Webb initially signed Bramble on loan before the deal was made permanent for a fee of £7,000. Bramble made over 150 league and cup appearances, scoring 40 goals, in four-and-a-half seasons at Southend United, and played for Southend in the Football League Trophy final at the Millennium Stadium in March 2004.

During his time at Southend United, Bramble was forced to play in goal against Boston United when goalkeeper Darryl Flahavan was sent off for handball outside the area. He kept a clean sheet for the period he was in goal, making a couple of inspired saves.

Bramble qualifies to play for Montserrat through his maternal grandfather and was called up in November 2004. He made his international debut in a Caribbean Cup qualifier against Antigua and Barbuda in which he scored but was unable to prevent Montserrat losing 5–4.

Bramble spent two months on loan at Cambridge United, where he scored three times in nine games, before being released by Southend United at the end of the 2004–05 season, and joining Stockport County on a two-year contract in June 2005. He made over 70 appearances for Stockport, scoring 12 goals. Bramble was out of contract in the summer of 2007 and signed for Stevenage Borough in July 2007, but was sidelined for two-months following knee surgery in November 2007. He was released at the end of the 2007–08 season, having made 11 Conference National appearances and scoring a one goal. He joined Eastern Counties League Premier Division club Leiston in August 2008. After his release from prison in November 2013 he joined Hadleigh United  and made more than 20 appearances for the club as they won the Thurlow Nunn League title. In June 2014, Bramble announced his retirement from football, but he subsequently retained his playing registration with Hadleigh and came on as a second-half substitute in a match on 27 September 2014.

In December 2014, Bramble signed terms with Ipswich Wanderers.

Personal life
In June 2011, Bramble was convicted of rape and sentenced to four-and-a-half years in prison, after a four-day trial at Leeds Crown Court

On 4 November 2013, Bramble was released after serving a two-and-a-half-year sentence.

References

External links

1980 births
Living people
21st-century English criminals
Association football forwards
Black British sportspeople
British male criminals
British people of Montserratian descent
Cambridge City F.C. players
Cambridge United F.C. players
Chelmsford City F.C. players
Criminals from Suffolk
English people convicted of rape
Felixstowe & Walton United F.C. players
Hadleigh United F.C. players
Ipswich Wanderers F.C. players
Leiston F.C. players
Montserrat international footballers
Montserratian expatriate footballers
Montserratian footballers
National League (English football) players
Sportspeople from Ipswich
Prisoners and detainees of England and Wales
Southend United F.C. players
Stevenage F.C. players
Stockport County F.C. players
English Football League players